Valonia ventricosa, also known as bubble algae, sea grape or sailor's eyeballs is a species of algae found in oceans throughout the world in tropical and subtropical regions, within the phylum Chlorophyta. It is one of the largest known unicellular organisms, if not the largest.

Characteristics
Valonia ventricosa has a coenocytic structure with multiple nuclei and chloroplasts. This organism possesses a large central vacuole which is multilobular in structure (lobules radiating from a central spheroid region).

The entire cell contains several cytoplasmic domains with each domain having a nucleus and a few chloroplasts. Cytoplasmic domains are interconnected by cytoplasmic "bridges" that are supported by microtubules. The peripheral cytoplasm (whose membrane is overlaid by the cell wall), is only about 40 nm thick.

Valonia ventricosa typically grow individually, but in rare cases they can grow in groups.

Environment
They appear in tidal zones of tropical and subtropical areas, like the Caribbean, north through Florida, south to Brazil, and in the Indo-Pacific. Overall, they inhabit every ocean throughout the world, often living in coral rubble.

Physiology and reproduction
The single-cell organism has forms ranging from spherical to ovoid, and the color varies from grass green to dark green, although in water they may appear to be silver, teal, or even blackish. This is determined by the quantity of chloroplasts of the specimen. The surface of the cell shines like glass when clean due to being extremely smooth with no texture.

Valonia ventricosa is among the largest known single-celled organisms. The "bubble" alga is attached by rhizoids to the substrate fibers.

Reproduction occurs by segregative cell division, where the multinucleate parent cell makes child cells, and individual rhizoids form new bubbles, which become separate from the parent cell.

Studies
Valonia ventricosa has been studied particularly because the cells are so unusually large that they provide a convenient subject for studying the transfer of water and water-soluble molecules across biological membranes. It was concluded that the properties of permeability in both osmosis and diffusion were identical, and that urea and formaldehyde molecules did not require any kind of postulated water-filled pores in the membrane to move through it. In studying the cellulose lattice, and its orientation in biological structures, Valonia ventricosa has undergone extensive X-ray analytical procedures. It has also been studied for its electrical properties, due to its unusually high electrical potential relative to the seawater that surrounds it.

In aquaria

Valonia ventricosa is considered a pest by some aquarium owners as it can reproduce quickly and potentially endanger the health of fish or other organisms.

See also 

 Xenophyophore

References

External links 
 
 
 Friday Fellow: Sailor's Eyeball at Earthling Nature.

Cladophorales